Kisecik Radar Station is a military installation located at Kisecik village of Antakya district in Hatay Province, southern Turkey.

Construction of the facility for use by  NATO started in 1998. It went into service in the summer of 2004. It is situated on a -high hilltop of the Nur Mountains close to the Syria–Turkey border. The radar station can cover an area including Middle Eastern countries, Syria and Northern Cyprus. The radar base has installations in underground and aboveground, and is protected by fences. The next radar base in Hatay Province is the Atik Plateau Radar Station at Belen, Hatay.

See also
 Kürecik Radar Station in Malatya Province, eastern Turkey

References

Military installations of the United States in Turkey
NATO installations in Turkey
Military installations established in 2004
2004 establishments in Turkey
Military in Hatay
Buildings and structures in Hatay Province
Antakya